Mirror image is an optical effect.

Mirror Image may also refer to:
"Mirror Image" (short story), 1972 short story by Isaac Asimov
Mirror Image, 1988 novel by Lucille Fletcher
Mirror Image (novel), 1998 novel by Danielle Steel
Mirror Image (Blood, Sweat & Tears album) and song from the 1974 album
Mirror Image (Joey Pearson EP) and song from the 2004 EP
"Mirror Image" (The Twilight Zone), 1960 episode of The Twilight Zone
"Mirror Image" (Quantum Leap), 1993 episode of the television series Quantum Leap
"Mirror Image", a song from the 2021 Weezer album, OK Human

See also
Mirror Images 2, 1993 American film